Patrick Joseph O'Connor (born November 1, 1993) is an American football defensive end for the Tampa Bay Buccaneers of the National Football League (NFL). He played college football at Eastern Michigan.

College career 
O'Connor recorded 42 tackles and 8.5 sacks as a senior playing for Eastern Michigan University. He recorded 166 total tackles and 20 sacks primarily playing the defensive end position in college, and was noted for his work ethic. He was named to the All-Mid-American Conference team in 2016.

Professional career

Detroit Lions
The Detroit Lions selected O’Connor in the seventh round with the 250th overall pick in the 2017 NFL Draft. On May 12, 2017, the Lions signed O'Connor to a four-year, $2.46 million contract with a signing bonus of $64,270. He was waived on September 2, 2017 and was signed to the Lions' practice squad the next day. He was released by the team on September 13, 2017.

Tampa Bay Buccaneers
On October 9, 2017, O'Connor was signed to the Tampa Bay Buccaneers' practice squad. He was promoted to the active roster on November 29, 2017.

On September 1, 2018, O'Connor was waived by the Buccaneers and was re-signed to the practice squad. He signed a reserve/future contract with the Buccaneers on December 31, 2018.

On September 2, 2019, O'Connor was waived by the Buccaneers and re-signed to the practice squad. He was promoted to the active roster on September 24, 2019.

In Week 14 against the Minnesota Vikings in 2020, O'Connor recorded his first career sack on Kirk Cousins during the 26–14 win. O'Connor played in all four games in the Buccaneers' playoff run that resulted in the team winning Super Bowl LV.

O'Connor was given an exclusive-rights free agent tender by the Buccaneers on March 9, 2021. He entrenched himself as a core special teams player for the Buccaneers in 2021. He suffered a knee injury in Week 15 and was placed on injured reserve on December 21. On March 15, 2022, the Buccaneers announced they would not tender O'Conner.

On April 12, 2022, the Buccaneers re-signed O'Connor to a one-year contract.

References

External links
Tampa Bay Buccaneers bio
Eastern Michigan Eagles bio
 

1993 births
Living people
Players of American football from Chicago
American football defensive ends
Eastern Michigan Eagles football players
Detroit Lions players
Tampa Bay Buccaneers players